Peter Gerard Torkildsen (born January 28, 1958) is an American Republican Party politician from Massachusetts. He represented the 13th Essex district, including his hometown of Danvers, in the Massachusetts House of Representatives from 1985 to 1991 and represented Massachusetts's 6th congressional district, covering much of Essex County, for two terms in the U.S. House from 1993 to 1997. Torkildsen also served as chair of the Massachusetts Republican Party from 2007 to 2009.

Life and career
Torkildsen was born into a Roman Catholic family with ten children in Milwaukee, Wisconsin on January 28, 1958. He attended high school at St. John's Preparatory School in Danvers, Massachusetts and then college at the University of Massachusetts Amherst and then went on to the prestigious John F. Kennedy School of Government at Harvard University. Before entering politics, he was a service coordinator for the Visiting Nurse Association of Boston.

Torkildsen served in the Massachusetts House of Representatives from 1985 to 1991. He had a conservative record on fiscal and social issues during his terms in the Massachusetts House and challenged State Senator Paul Cellucci for the Republican nomination for Lt. Governor of Massachusetts in 1990 as an anti-abortion candidate. From 1991 to 1992, Torklidsen was the state's Commissioner of Labor and Industries.

U.S. House of Representatives
He then went on to represent  for two terms from 1993 until 1997. In Congress, he was conservative on defense spending and fiscal restraint, but was pro-choice, in particular voting against the 1996 Partial Birth Abortion Ban. During his campaign for Chairman of the Massachusetts Republican Party in 2007, he claimed that he had a problem with the wording of the bill as it excluded an exception for saving the mother's life, and had he been re-elected would have supported a similar bill with the exception. He also supported the 1996 Defense of Marriage Act.

He was narrowly defeated in the Presidential-year election of 1996 by Democrat John F. Tierney in a state that voted overwhelmingly for Democratic President Bill Clinton in that year's Presidential election.

Tierney was part of a net eight seat Democratic gain in the House elections that year. Torkildsen challenged Tierney to a rematch in the United States House election, 1998, but Tierney won that contest as well, 55%–43%. Since Torkildsen and Peter I. Blute left Congress in 1997, there have been no Republicans elected to the House of Representatives from Massachusetts.

After political office
Since leaving the House, Torklidsen has returned to working in labor and workforce related areas. From 2001 to 2003, he served as a Commissioner on the Massachusetts Labor Relations Commission. In 2003, he was the Director of Federal, State and Local Workforce Relations for the Massachusetts Department of Workforce Development. Since 2004, he has been the Executive Director of the Massachusetts Workforce Investment Board.  Desiring to lead the repair of a Massachusetts Republican Party, Torkildsen announced in December 2006 that he would run in the January 2007 election for State Party Chairman. Torkildsen left the Massachusetts Workforce Investment Board with Gov. Deval Patrick's inauguration.

On January 17, 2007, Torkildsen defeated five opponents in his first ballot election to be chair of the Massachusetts Republican State Committee. Torkildsen received 58% of the vote. In January, 2009, Torkildsen chose not to run for re-election as Chair.

After the 2021 storming of the United States Capitol, Torkildsen was one of 23 former Republican members of Congress to call for the impeachment of President Donald Trump.

References

External links

|-

1958 births
Living people
Politicians from Milwaukee
Harvard Kennedy School alumni
Republican Party members of the Massachusetts House of Representatives
Massachusetts Republican Party chairs
University of Massachusetts Amherst alumni
Republican Party members of the United States House of Representatives from Massachusetts
Catholics from Wisconsin